Cynthia "Cindy" Armour Coyne (born November 8, 1961) is an American politician who served as a Democratic member of the Rhode Island Senate representing District 32 from January 2013 to January 2023. She was a Rhode Island State Trooper and reached the rank of lieutenant before her retirement in 2006. Before she was elected to the state's Senate, she was on the Barrington Town Council.

References 

1961 births
Living people
Politicians from Barrington, Rhode Island
Democratic Party Rhode Island state senators
21st-century American politicians